Antonio Zatta (fl. 1757 – April 2, 1797) was an Italian cartographer and publisher who was based in Venice. He may have lived from 1722 to 1804. One of his major contributions include the Atlante Novissimo, a four volume atlas of the world.
 He also published an edition of the plays of Goldoni with engravings in 1789.

Gallery

See also
Sea of the West

References

External links

Antonio Zatta at Geographicus.com
Antonio Zatta at alteagallery.com
Antonio Zatta at bergbook.com
 

1722 births
1804 deaths
18th-century Italian cartographers